WVAS (90.7 FM) is a jazz-music formatted radio station in the Montgomery, Alabama, market licensed to the Alabama State University. WVAS is a member-supported non-commercial, educational station featuring news and other programming from National Public Radio and Public Radio Exchange. National programming produced by WVAS includes Café Jazz, distributed nationally by the African-American Public Radio Consortium.

WVAS began broadcasting on June 15, 1984, from the fifth floor of the Levi Watkins Learning Center. Two years later, the station moved to its current location at Thomas Kilby Hall. Broadcasting from its transmitter on campus, WVAS has a signal that spans 18 counties, reaching a total population of more than 651,000.

In September 2007, WVAS received a grant from the Corporation for Public Broadcasting to assist in its conversion from analog to digital broadcasting. WVAS was one of just two radio stations in Alabama to receive such a grant.

See also
 List of jazz radio stations in the United States

References

External links
WVAS official website

VAS
Jazz radio stations in the United States
Radio stations established in 1984
Alabama State University
NPR member stations
1984 establishments in Alabama
College radio stations in Alabama